Plosovo is a small settlement at the southern end of the Mišja Valley (Mišja dolina) southwest of Velike Lašče in central Slovenia. The entire Municipality of Velike Lašče is part of the traditional region of Lower Carniola and is now included in the Central Slovenia Statistical Region.

References

External links

Plosovo on Geopedia

Populated places in the Municipality of Velike Lašče